Sree Bhuvaneswari Higher Secondary School, managed by the Kurattikadu Pattambalam Devaswam, was founded in 1974 with LKG classes and has now grown into a cluster of schools comprising the Sree Bhuvaneswari Sisu Vidyalayam-the nursery, Sree Bhuvaneswari English Medium High School, Sree Bhuvaneswari Higher Secondary School and Sree Bhuvaneswari CBSE School. It is an unaided higher secondary school recognized by the Government of Kerala with a total strength of more than 2000 students and more than 100 staff members. It is situated at Mannar.

See also
 Mannar
 Alappuzha
 Kerala

References

External links
The official website of the school
Kurattikadu Pattambalam Temple

Schools in Alappuzha district
Educational institutions established in 1974
1974 establishments in Kerala